A list of windmills in the Dutch province of Friesland.

Locations

A

B

C, D

E

F, G

H

I, J

K, L

M

N

O

P, R

S

T – V

W – Z

Notes

Mills still standing marked in bold. Known building dates are bold, otherwise the date is the earliest known date the mill was standing.

References

 
Friesland